Carabus lusitanicus lusitanicus is a subspecies of black-coloured  beetle from family Carabidae, found in Portugal and Spain.

References

lusitanicus lusitanicus
Beetles described in 1927
Endemic fauna of Spain